Green muscardine disease is the presentation of a fungal infection of insects caused by members of the Metarhizium or Nomuraea species.  Once the fungus has killed its host it covers the host's cuticle with a layer of green spores, hence the name of the disease.  It was originally discovered as a pest of silk worms, upon which it was highly lethal.  To insect mycologists and microbial control specialists, "green muscardine" refers to fungal infection caused by Metarhizium spp., whereas in sericulture, "green muscardine" refers to a similar fungal infection caused by Nomuraea rileyi.  Green muscardine has been identified as disease of over 200 known insect species.

References

Insect diseases